The Regina Plant  was a automotive manufacturing plant owned by General Motors Canada located in Regina, Saskatchewan. Regina was selected because Saskatchewan was centrally located in Western Canada and was the third most populous province in Canada. The plant had 1,000 jobs. The building was decommissioned in 2020 and as of 2021, a study is planned to be conducted on whether to demolish the building.

History 
The plant produced Chevrolets, Oldsmobiles, and Pontiacs. At the time, it was the largest manufacturing plant in Regina.

In October 1929, the Wall Street Crash of 1929 occurred causing car sales to decrease sharply. The plant laid off some workers in early 1930. By August 1930, all production at the plant was stopped. In March 1931, the plant reopened, but production once again stopped a few months later.

In 1937, the plant reopened after General Motors spent  (almost half the original cost of the plant) on renovations. The reopened plant had 400 jobs, under half then what it had when it originally opened. The plant also began producing Buicks and Maple Leaf trucks (modified Chevrolet trucks).

In 1941, due to World War II, plant was taking over by the Government of Canada, making GM no longer the owner, renamed Regina Industries Limited and was converted to the largest munitions plant in Saskatchewan, primarily focusing on gun carriages and anti-tank guns. In 1943, the plant employed 1,596 people. After the war, the plant was no longer used for vehicle manufacturing as production and distribution techniques changed, making it impractical for General Motors to operate the plant. The plant was used by the Department of National Defence until the mid-1960s. The building was acquired by the Government of Saskatchewan in 1967 and was used by various tenants.  In 1987 the building was purchased by the City of Regina.  It housed several City departments as well as private and public sector tenants.  

On May 3, 2017 the Regina Plant caught fire, causing significant damage to the building. The surrounding areas was blocked off and power was cut to prevent further fire. 

The plant is still standing and was used by several businesses for commercial purposes until 2020, when the building was decommissioned by the City of Regina. As of 2021, a study is planned to be conducted on whether to demolish the building, citing environmental concerns and asbestos in the building. The adjacent office building will not be demolished due to its heritage designation, and is still in use.

Brands produced 
 Buick
 Chevrolet (cars and trucks)
 Chevrolet Maple Leaf
 Oldsmobile
 Pontiac

See also 
 List of former automotive manufacturing plants

References 

Buildings and structures in Regina, Saskatchewan
General Motors Canada
Former motor vehicle assembly plants
Motor vehicle assembly plants in Canada